Estádio Major Antônio Couto Pereira, often shortened to Couto Pereira, is the home of Coritiba Foot Ball Club, located in Curitiba, Paraná state, Brazil. Its formal name honors Major Antônio Couto Pereira, who was Coritiba's president in 1926, 1927, and between 1930 and 1933. He started the stadium construction.

History

In 1927, Major Antônio Couto Pereira, the club's president at that time, acquired a 36,300 m² area, paying for it a hundred contos de réis. Between the groundplot purchase, which should also accommodate the club's headquarters at the Alto da Glória neighborhood, and the stadium construction, almost five years passed.

The stadium was originally named after Belfort Duarte,. The stadium was named after Belfort Duarte because the Coritiba counselors did not come to an agreement about the stadium name. The name Belfort Duarte was chosen by president Couto Pereira as a provisory name, which lasted 45 years.

The stadium floodlights were inaugurated in 1942, when Coritiba beat Avaí 4-2.

On February 28, 1977, a General Assembly renamed the stadium to Major Antônio Couto Pereira, after the club's former president died.

In 1988 a ditch around the pitch was built, to prevent supporters from entering the field, and to give a more modern look to the stadium. At the same time the cabins were built, which reduced the stadium capacity, but also made it more comfortable.

The inaugural match was played on November 20, 1932, when Coritiba beat América 4-2. The first goal of the stadium was scored by Coritiba's Gildo.

The stadium's attendance record in a football match currently stands at 80,000 set on August 18, 1998 when Coritiba beat São Paulo 2-1.

The stadium's general attendance record was set on August 5, 1980, when 70,000 people came to see Pope John Paul II.

Coldplay will perform at the stadium on 21 and 22 March 2023 as part of their Music of the Spheres World Tour.

References

External links
 Templos do Futebol
 Coritiba Official Website

Sport in Curitiba
Couto Pereira
Sports venues in Paraná (state)
Coritiba Foot Ball Club